Teele Nts'onyana (born 22 June 1970) is a Mosotho former footballer who played as a striker. Between 1997 and 2004, he won seven caps and scored two goals for the Lesotho national football team.

External links 
 

Association football forwards
Lesotho footballers
Lesotho international footballers
1970 births
Living people
Mpumalanga Black Aces F.C. players
Bidvest Wits F.C. players
Lesotho expatriate footballers
Expatriate soccer players in South Africa
Lesotho expatriate sportspeople in South Africa